Caplan is a surname.

Caplan may also refer to:
 Caplan, Quebec, Canada
 Caplan station, a former train station
 Caplan's, a former department store in Ottawa, Ontario, Canada
 Caplan's syndrome, rheumatoid pneumoconiosis

See also
 Caplen (disambiguation)
 Kaplan (disambiguation)